The team eventing was an equestrian event held as part of the Equestrian at the 1912 Summer Olympics programme. It was the first appearance of the event.  The team score was simply the sum of the best three scores for each nation in the individual eventing competition.

Results

References

Sources
 
 

Equestrian at the 1912 Summer Olympics